Brigadier George William Charles Draffen  (12 May 1899 – 17 February 1986) was a British Army officer who saw action during the Second World War.

Military career
Draffen was confirmed as a lieutenant in the 2nd Dragoon Guards (Queen's Bays) on 20 December 1920. He became commanding officer of his regiment in 1940 and went to be commander of 26th Armoured Brigade in 1943 during the North African campaign of the Second World War. He served as colonel of the 2nd Dragoon Guards (Queen's Bays) from 1954 to 1959 when the regiment amalgamated with the 1st King's Dragoon Guards to form the 1st The Queen's Dragoon Guards, he then served as colonel of that regiment from 1961 to 1964.

References

External links
Generals of World War II

1899 births
1986 deaths
Companions of the Distinguished Service Order
2nd Dragoon Guards (Queen's Bays) officers
British Army personnel of World War II